Dyanna Lauren (born March 18, 1965) is an American erotic dancer, pornographic actress, singer and director.

Career
She has appeared in over 200 movies between 1989 and 2000; in the years since, she has shifted away from acting and towards directing, even though she has remained an active onscreen performer into the 2010s.

Lauren was a singer before entering the adult industry. She explained her career change by saying, "I decided that if I was going to get screwed, I would at least get paid for it". Lauren has also composed a song called Psycho Magnet, a hard-rock ballad about being a porn star and being constantly stalked and harassed by "mentally ill mooks". Lauren's performance of the song, however, has been criticized by David Foster Wallace as having an argumentation that "strikes yr and a bit uneven" while also criticizing Lauren's singing as sounding like a "scalded cat". She performed "Silent Night/Feliz Navidad" with Moby on the 2003 album of the 2001 film Moby Presents: Alien Sex Party.

Lauren started out in porn appearing on box-covers for films that she was not in. Later, before deciding on going all the way on film, she would often make brief appearances in non-sexual roles, but would still front the film's cover nonetheless. Lauren was the Penthouse Pet of the Month in July 1995, and has been a contract performer with Vivid Entertainment. She was the first to appear as a single guest on Playboy TV's The Helmetcam Show. This appearance was broadcast live on August 21, 1996.

In addition to her work in adult films, Lauren also sang and appeared on the Marilyn Manson album Mechanical Animals, along with fellow porn star Kobe Tai. She also sang in the rock band Thousand Year Itch, who released one album in 2000.

In 2007 she became the CEO and spokesperson of Ninn Worx_SR, a film production company which is owned by her ex-husband, John Gray. Lauren was inducted into the AVN Hall of Fame at ceremonies held on January 12, 2008. In April 2009 she began filming for her first feature appearance in over ten years.
Dyanna was also a performer for a time at the World's Famous Hollywood Tropicana Mud and Oil Wrestling.

Personal life
Lauren identifies as bisexual.

She is of English, German, Irish, Australian and Native American descent.

She was married to Wild Boyz founder, Kurt Lee Hurley and John Grey, founder of the Spearmint Rhino Gentlemen's Club chain.

Awards
 1997 XRCO Award – Best Actress, Single Performance (Bad Wives)
 1998 AVN Award – Best Actress, Film (Bad Wives)
 1998 AVN Award – Best Anal Sex Scene, Film (Bad Wives) with Steven St. Croix
 2008 AVN Hall of Fame inductee
 2010 XBIZ Award – Performer Comeback of the Year

References

External links

 
 
 
 
 Dyanna Lauren  Agency Website at Adult Talent Managers (Los Angeles)

Living people
1965 births
American female erotic dancers
American erotic dancers
American female adult models
American pornographic film actresses
American people of Australian descent
American people of English descent
American people of Irish descent
American people who self-identify as being of Native American descent
American people of German descent
American pornographic film directors
American women in business
Bisexual pornographic film actresses
Bisexual singers
Bisexual songwriters
Bisexual dancers
Bisexual businesspeople
LGBT adult models
American LGBT businesspeople
American LGBT singers
American LGBT songwriters
LGBT people from California
Penthouse Pets
Pornographic film actors from California
Women pornographic film directors
20th-century American LGBT people
21st-century American LGBT people
20th-century American women singers
21st-century American women singers